The 38th edition of the annual Hypo-Meeting took place on May 26 and May 27, 2012 in Götzis, Austria. The track and field competition, featuring a men's decathlon and a women's heptathlon event was part of the 2012 IAAF World Combined Events Challenge. Hans van Alphen and Jessica Ennis led the men's and women's competition, respectively, after the first day.  Ennis (6906 points) and van Alphen (8516 points) were the winners of the events overall. Ennis' score was a British record.

Men's Decathlon

Schedule 

May 26

May 27

Records

Results

Women's heptathlon

Schedule 

May 26 

May 27

Records

Results

References 

 Results
 Women's Event by Event Heptathlon Scores
 Men's Event by Event Decathlon Scores

2011
Hypo-Meeting
Hypo-Meeting